Craig Leith may be (in Scotland):
Craig Leith (hill), in the Ochil Hills
Craigleith, an island
Craigleith, Edinburgh, a suburb